European route E14 is a part of the International E-road network. It begins in Trondheim, Norway, and ends in Sundsvall, Sweden.

The road follows the route Trondheim - Storlien – Östersund – Sundsvall.

After crossing the border from Norway it runs through the mountainous western Jämtland County of Sweden, passing the well-known Ånnsjön mountain lake.

References

External links 
 UN Economic Commission for Europe: Overall Map of E-road Network (2007)

14
E014
E014